is a 1989 action role-playing game developed by Nihon Falcom. It is the third game in the Ys series.

Ys III was initially released for the PC-8801 and PC-9801 in 1989 under the title Wanderers from Ys, and versions for the MSX2 and X68000 soon followed. In 1991, a number of console ports were produced: versions for the TurboGrafx-CD, Famicom, Super NES, and Sega Genesis. A remake for the PlayStation 2 was released by Taito in 2005.

The TurboGrafx-CD, SNES, and Genesis ports, as well as the 2005 remake Ys: The Oath in Felghana, received releases in English. In addition, the Famicom and MSX2 ports have been fan-translated.

Plot
The opening scene informs the player that it has been three years since the events of Ys I and Ys II. Adol Christin and his friend Dogi are on a journey.  Passing through a town, they find a gypsy caravan and Dogi has his fortune told. The fortune teller's crystal ball explodes and both Adol and Dogi decide to go to Dogi's hometown of Redmont. On the way to Redmont, the pair chance upon a wildcat that attacks them, saving Dogi's childhood friend, Elena Stoddart, in the process. Upon arriving, they learn that the townspeople are being threatened by men from nearby Valestein Castle. Always ready for adventure, Adol decides to assume the task of helping them out.

Travelling to Tigray Quarry, Adol discovers that there has been a cave in, and monsters have taken over the quarry.  Adol travels deep inside the quarry to rescue Edgar, the mayor of Redmont. After defeating the boss of the Quarry, Ellefale, and claiming the first statue, Adol finds Chester (brother of Elena) threatening Edgar. Adol pulls Edgar back out to the entrance of the quarry and goes back to Redmont. Meeting Elena (formally this time), Adol learns that some statues are being sought by Lord MacGuire, the King of Felghana province (where the game takes place).  Another statue is being sought in the Illsburn Ruins, so Adol travels there to retrieve it.  Another townsperson, Father Pierre, has gone there as well.  Adol gets to an altar of sorts, where he overhears Chester talking with Pierre. After a brief duel with Chester, Adol is caught, and tells Chester that Elena is worried about him. With Lord MacGuire watching, Chester rebuffs Adol and kicks him down into a pit of lava. Battling through monsters, Adol finds a fire dragon, Gilan, and defeats him.  The reward gets Adol over a large river of lava by solidifying it. After escaping from the pit, Ellena meets Adol at the top of a staircase. She informs him that the statue is indeed hidden further on. He opens a hidden door and fights a Wyvern, claiming the second statue.

Upon coming back to the town, Adol meets up with Dogi, who informs him that he is heading off to the mountains and that Edgar wishes to see Adol. Adol meets with Edgar, who informs him that men from Valestein (Ballacetine in the SNES version) Castle are actively seeking the statues. He informs Adol of a statue in Tigray Quarry. Adol proceeds to the quarry and defeats the monster guarding the third statue.  Adol then heads back to Redmont to inform Edgar. Upon arriving at Edgar's house, he interrupts a conversation between Edgar, Lord MacGuire and Bishop Garland about Galbalan.  Galbalan, according to Edgar, is a demon of tremendous power who used to rule over the populace of Felgana a long time ago. He was sealed away by a hero using the four statues.  Adol is sent to the Eldarm Mountains to chat with the hermit living there. Adol finds Dogi chatting with the Master up on the mountain. The Master tells Adol that a statue is indeed in the mountains, but inaccessible due to a statue that guards the entrance. Adol travels up the mountain to the peak and defeats a Harpy, gaining the staff that opens the way to the statue. He defeats the guardian Dragon, and claims the fourth and final statue. Chester show up, and tries to force Adol to hand over the four statues. A cave in interrupts the conversation, and Dogi digs the two men out.  Chester is reunited with Dogi, and they converse briefly.  Adol and Dogi leave for town, and find it almost deserted, with Mr. Gardner, the town guard, nowhere to be found.  Inside the walls, they find Mr. Gardner and some of the townsfolk. Apparently, while Adol and Dogi were in the mountains, soldiers from Valestein Castle came to the town and kidnapped townsfolk in exchange for the statues. Adol converses with Edgar before setting out for the castle.

At Valestein Castle, Adol fights his way down to the dungeons where he finds the townspeople and Father Pierre.  He tells Pierre to get the people out of the castle, and goes to find Lord MacGuire. On the way to Lord MacGuire's chambers, he comes across Bishop Garland, who taunts Adol. Garland then reveals himself, and Adol defeats him after a lengthy battle. Upon reaching Lord MacGuire, Adol finds that Lord MacGuire is repentant, and is sorry for his actions. He will make reparations for his actions.  As Adol goes back across a bridge, he is met by Elena, who congratulates him on beating the soldiers and being a hero.  Galbalan, who has reawoken due to the seal of the statues being broken, kidnaps Elena in midair and taunts Adol, telling him to bring the statues to his island fortress. Adol goes back to town, doubting himself.  Edgar and Dogi bring Adol back to his senses, and Adol sets off to rescue Elena. Surviving many challenges, Adol comes to a platform where Ellena and Chester are talking to each other. Galbalan taunts Chester just as Adol arrives. Adol promises the statues to Galbalan, if he will not harm Chester or Elena. Galbalan agrees, and pulls Adol up to his realm. Adol fights and defeats Galbalan, and rescues Elena.

Adol finds out that Chester has gone to the very center of Galbalan's Island, to seal it away. Ellena tells Adol that her village and its people are descendants of the man who sealed away Galbalan the first time. Only Chester knows how to sink Galbalan's island, and Adol must not interfere. Adol understands and he and Elena leave the sinking island. The scene shifts to Chester, who is manipulating crystals to sink the island for good. He tells Adol to take care of Elena for him, before sacrificing himself to destroy the island. The island then disappears for good.

Back in Redmont, Adol and Dogi are at the Inn getting ready to leave. Dogi tells Adol to go on ahead, as he has something to take care of. They are leaving in the early morning as to not cause a stir within the community. Dogi is chatting with Ellena, who is in love with Adol. Dogi leaves, and Ellena almost stays. She then walks out of the Inn. Mr. Gardner is asking Adol what he and Dogi are planning. Mr. Gardner would like Adol and Dogi to stay, but Adol wants to have more adventures. He and Dogi leave, and as they are walking along the shore, Ellena runs up and shouts to them.  Both Dogi and Adol wave goodbye. Elena cries as text scrolls telling about further adventures waiting for Adol and Dogi.

Gameplay

Instead of the top-down camera view used in previous Ys games, Ys III uses a side-scrolling platformer presentation. Auto-attack is removed; the player must push a button to make Adol attack enemies.

Otherwise, the gameplay mechanics are identical to previous entries in the series. The statistics, equipment, shopping, experience system, and magic all function the same as in Ys I and II (though spells are represented by rings instead of wand icons, and MP is renamed "Ring Power"), and neither the player character nor the enemies have temporary invincibility.

Music
The soundtrack to the original version of Ys III was entirely composed by Mieko Ishikawa. The X68000 version of the game introduced a number of additional compositions, which were composed by Masaaki Kawai. Kawai was also responsible for the arrangements of Ishikawa's existing compositions for this version.

Falcom has released a number of music CDs dedicated to the music of Ys III. They include:
 Music from Ys III: Wanderers from Ys (1989): Soundtrack to the original PC-8801 edition of Ys III, along with three tracks from the X68000 edition.
 Wanderers from Ys Super Arrange Version (1989): A collection of arranged tracks from Ys III by Hiroyuki Nanba and Atsushi Yokozeki.
 Ys III J.D.K. Special (1990): The complete soundtrack to the X68000 version of Ys III, along with four rock music arrangements from Falcom's J.D.K. Band.
 Perfect Collection Ys III (1990): A two-CD set entirely dedicated to Ys III. The first disc is a complete arrangement of the Ys III soundtrack, including the X68000-introduced tracks, by Ryo Yonemitsu (who also arranged the TurboGrafx-CD version's CD-DA tracks), Yoshio Tsuru and  Kanji Saito. The second disc contains additional Ys III arrangements in various musical styles.

To commemorate the release of the Ys III remake The Oath in Felghana in 2005 (see below), Falcom released Ys Premium Music CD Box in Felghana, a boxed set with most of all Ys III music produced.

Ys: The Oath in Felghana

In 2005, Falcom released Ys: The Oath in Felghana for Microsoft Windows, a remake of Ys III. The Oath in Felghana slightly modifies and greatly expands on the story of the original Ys III, and expands the dungeons to extend the gameplay time. The original side-scroller was also replaced with a 3D game engine, based on that used in Ys VI: The Ark of Napishtim.

In 2010, Falcom released a version of Ys: The Oath in Felghana for the PlayStation Portable, which Xseed Games officially released in English later the same year.
This was followed in 2012 by a newly localized version of the original 2005 PC release.

Reception

SNES
Entertainment Weekly criticized the inability to control the storyline and described the combat as tedious and repetitive.

References 

1989 video games
Action role-playing video games
Hudson Soft games
MSX2 games
NEC PC-8801 games
NEC PC-9801 games
Nihon Falcom games
Nintendo Entertainment System games
PlayStation 2 games
Sega Genesis games
X68000 games
Side-scrolling role-playing video games
Single-player video games
Super Nintendo Entertainment System games
Taito games
Tonkin House games
TurboGrafx-CD games
Video games scored by Noriyuki Iwadare
Ys (series)
Video games developed in Japan